Harold Lester Johnson (April 17, 1921 – April 2, 1980) was an American astronomer.

Harold Johnson was born in Denver, Colorado, on April 17, 1921.  He received his early education in Denver public schools and went to the University of Denver, graduating with a degree in mathematics in 1942.  Johnson was recruited by the MIT Radiation Laboratory to work on World War II related radar research. After the war Johnson began graduate studies in astronomy at University of California, Berkeley where he completed his thesis under Harold Weaver in 1948.

In the following years working at Lowell Observatory, University of Wisconsin–Madison, Yerkes Observatory (where he met William Wilson Morgan), McDonald Observatory, University of Texas–Austin, the Lunar and Planetary Laboratory in Tucson, Arizona, and the National Autonomous University of Mexico he applied his instrumental and electronic talents to developing and calibrating astronomical photoelectric detectors.
He died of a heart attack in Mexico City in 1980. He and his wife, Mary Elizabeth Jones, had two children.

Johnson was awarded the Helen B. Warner Prize by the American Astronomical Society in 1956. He was elected to the National Academy of Sciences in 1969. He is remembered for introducing the UBV photometric system (also called the Johnson or Johnson-Morgan system), along with William Wilson Morgan in 1953.

External links
 National Academy of Sciences Biography by Gérard Henri de Vaucouleurs
 

1921 births
1980 deaths
20th-century  American astronomers
Members of the United States National Academy of Sciences
Scientists from Denver
University of Denver alumni
Massachusetts Institute of Technology staff
University of California, Berkeley alumni